New Objectivity (a translation of the German Neue Sachlichkeit, alternatively translated as "New Sobriety" or "New matter-of-factness") was an art movement that emerged in Germany in the early 1920s as a counter to expressionism.  The term applies to a number of artistic forms, including film.

History
In film, New Objectivity reached its high point around 1929.  It translated into realistic cinematic settings, straightforward camerawork and editing, a tendency to examine inanimate objects as a way to interpret characters and events, a lack of overt emotionalism, and social themes.

Notable directors
The director most associated with the movement is Georg Wilhelm Pabst. Pabst's films of the 1920s concentrate on subjects such as abortion, prostitution, labor disputes, homosexuality, and addiction. His cool and critical 1925 Joyless Street is a landmark of the objective style.  Pabst's 1930 pacifist sound film Westfront 1918 views the World War I experience in a bleak, matter-of-fact way.  With its clear denunciation of war, it was soon banned as unsuitable for public viewing.

Other directors in the style included Ernő Metzner, Berthold Viertel, and Gerhard Lamprecht.

Decline
The movement ended essentially in 1933 with the fall of the Weimar Republic.

Films 

Films with New Objectivity themes and visual style include:

 Joyless Street, 1925
 Secrets of a Soul, 1926
 Uneasy Money, 1926
 The Love of Jeanne Ney, 1927
 Police Report: Hold-Up, short subject, 1928
 Pandora's Box, 1929
 People on Sunday, 1930
 Westfront 1918, 1930

References 

 
 
 
 
Cinema of Germany
1920s in film
1930s in film